Jussi Nättinen (born July 15, 1987) is a Finnish professional ice hockey player. He is currently playing for Anglet Hormadi Élite of the French Ligue Magnus.

Nättinen played seven games in Liiga for JYP during the 2017–18 Liiga season. He was also formerly the captain of Hermes in the Mestis.

References

External links

1987 births
Living people
Beibarys Atyrau players
Finnish ice hockey centres
Hokki players
JYP-Akatemia players
JYP Jyväskylä players
KeuPa HT players
Kiekko-Laser players
Kokkolan Hermes players
KooKoo players
Sportspeople from Jyväskylä
Starbulls Rosenheim players
21st-century Finnish people